Anderson Arménio Gomes Correia (born 31 October 1997) is a Cape Verdean basketball player who currently plays for Petro de Luanda and the Cape Verde national team.

Professional career
During the 2018 to 2020 seasons, Anderson performed for the Clube do Prédio - Cabo Verde, where he was Regional and National champion. 2020–21 season, Correia played for Coração do Ribatejo in the Portuguese Proliga. Correia also played with the Achada Panters in the 2021 Praia Basketball League, helping his team win the championship.

He started the 2021–22 season with Coração do Ribatejo of the Portuguese second-tier Proliga. He averaged 23.7 points and 11.8 rebounds per game before leaving the team. On 14 March 2022, Correia signed with Petro de Luanda of the Angolan Basketball League and the Basketball Africa League (BAL).

National team career
Correia was on the Cape Verde national basketball team for AfroBasket 2021.

Awards and accomplishments
Petro de Luanda
Taça de Angola: (2022)

References

External links
Anderson Correia at RealGM

1997 births
Shooting guards
Cape Verdean men's basketball players
Cape Verdean expatriate basketball people in Angola
Cape Verdean expatriate basketball people in Portugal
Living people